CILE-FM is a community radio station that operates at 95.1 FM in Havre-Saint-Pierre, Quebec.

Owned by Radio-Télévision communautaire Havre-Saint-Pierre, the station was licensed in 1990 and was launched in 1991.

The station is a member of the Association des radiodiffuseurs communautaires du Québec.

Transmitters

References

External links
www.cilemf.com
 

Ile
Ile
Ile
Radio stations established in 1990
1990 establishments in Quebec